Lazy Bird is an album by guitarist Doug Raney recorded in 1984 and released on the Danish label, SteepleChase.

Reception 

Scott Yanow of AllMusic called it "Excellent modern mainstream straight-ahead jazz".

Track listing 
All compositions by Doug Raney except where noted.
 "Walking the Duck" [take 3] – 3:42 Bonus track on CD reissue
 "Reggie of Chester" (Benny Golson) – 7:54
 "Feo's Waltz" – 6:51
 "Lazy Bird" (John Coltrane) – 9:06
 "Beatrice" (Sam Rivers) – 7:48
 "Theme for Ernie" (Fred Lacey) – 14:04    
 "Walking the Duck" – 2:43

Personnel 
Doug Raney – guitar
Bernt Rosengren – tenor saxophone
Ben Besiakov – piano
Jesper Lundgaard – bass
Ole Jacob Hansen – drums

References 

Doug Raney albums
1984 albums
SteepleChase Records albums